Haračić is a surname. Notable people with the surname include:

Ambroz Haračić (1855–1916), Croatian botanist
DiDi Haracic (born 1992), American soccer player
Dženan Haračić (born 1994), Bosnia and Herzegovina footballer
Emina Haračič (born 1995), Slovenian rhythmic gymnast
Izet Haračić (1965-2015), Bosnian bobsledder

Bosnian surnames
Croatian surnames